Akim Abuakwa North is one of the constituencies represented in the Parliament of Ghana. It elects one Member of Parliament (MP) by the first past the post system of election. The constituency is located in the Abuakwa North Municipal District of the Eastern Region of Ghana.

Members of Parliament 

Samuel Kwadwo Amoako was the member of parliament for the constituency between January 2009 and January 2013. He was elected on the ticket of the New Patriotic Party (NPP)
and won a majority of 5,046 votes to become the MP. He succeeded J. B. Danquah-Adu who had won the seat in December 2004 with the NPP. J. B. Danquah-Adu won the seat back in the 2016 Ghanaian general election. J. B. Danquah-Adu was murdered on 9 February 2016 at his home.

See also
List of Ghana Parliament constituencies

References

Parliamentary constituencies in the Eastern Region (Ghana)